Qanyaruq-e Bala (also Romanized as Qānyārūq-e Bālā; also known as Guniarūkh Bāla, Qanīāroq-e Bālā, Qānyāroq-e ‘Olyā, Qānyārūq-e ‘Olyā, and Qonyārūq-e ‘Olya) is a village in Sedeh Rural District, in the Central District of Arak County, Markazi Province, Iran. At the 2006 census, its population was 55, in 16 families.

References 

Populated places in Arak County